Dead Silence is a 1997 Canadian-American crime thriller television film directed by Daniel Petrie Jr. and written by Donald E. Stewart, based on the 1995 novel A Maiden's Grave by Jeffery Deaver. The film stars James Garner, Kim Coates, Marlee Matlin, and Lolita Davidovich.

Release
Dead Silence premiered on HBO during January 1997. That year the film was also released on VHS in Australia, the UK and several other countries.

A few months after its HBO premiere, the film was screened at the 1997 edition of the Cannes Film Festival, despite being a made for TV production. It also received a theatrical release in Japan.

It was released on DVD in the USA in 2005, and in 2007 in Australia.

Reception
In their June 1997 review, Variety labelled it "strictly for undemanding thriller fans", and commented that, "For most of its length, Dead Silence is a routine hostage drama, though a couple of plot twists in the final reel, while implausible, enliven the hitherto mundane fodder."

Premise
A veteran FBI agent negotiates the release of a bus load of hearing impaired school children taken hostage by three desperate escaped convicts.

Cast
 James Garner as FBI Special Agent John Potter
 Kim Coates as Ted Handy
 Marlee Matlin as Melanie Charrol
 Lolita Davidovich as Priss Gunder / Detective Sharon Foster
 Charles Martin Smith as Roland W. Marks
 Kenneth Welsh as Sheriff Lenny Budd
 James Villemaire as Ray "Sonny" Bonner
 Gary Basaraba as Shephard "Shep" Wilcox
 Barclay Hope as Sheriff Gene Stillwell
 Vanessa Vaughan as Susan
 Blu Mankuma as FBI Special Agent Henry Lebow
 Mimi Kuzyk as Donna Harkstrawn
 Scott Speedman as Officer Stevie Cardy
 John Bourgeois as Major Daniel Tremaine
 Neil Crone as Airport Security Officer
 Sharon Dunn as TV News Narrator
 Craig Eldridge as Roger Elb
 Adrian Hough as FBI Agent Pete Henderson
 Ted Whittall as Toby Geller
 Justin Dressler as Sam
 Kristin Dressler as Annie
 Lisa Dressler as Jocelyn
 Christy Elliott as Beverly
 Trista Langford as Emily
 Vance Youngs as Kevin

Awards and nominations

See also
 List of films featuring the deaf and hard of hearing

Notes

References

External links
 
 

1997 films
1997 television films
1997 crime thriller films
American television films
American crime thriller films
Canadian crime thriller films
Crime television films
Canadian thriller television films
American Sign Language films
English-language Canadian films
HBO Films films
Alliance Films films
Interscope Communications films
Films about deaf people
Films about hostage takings
Films about the Federal Bureau of Investigation
Films based on American crime novels
Films based on American thriller novels
Films directed by Daniel Petrie Jr.
Films set in New York (state)
Films shot in Toronto
Films shot in Vancouver
1990s American films
1990s Canadian films